Commonwealth Observer Groups are groups formed to monitor elections in various countries around the world. Each group is usually made up of various statesmen from various countries in the Commonwealth of Nations. The job of each Group is to assess whether the elections are conducted fairly. At the end of the observation period, reports are written and submitted to the Commonwealth headquarters. The following are such groups formed to date:

Antigua and Barbuda
Bangladesh
Cameroon
Gambia
Ghana
Guyana
Fiji
Kenya
Lesotho
Malawi
Maldives
Malta
Mozambique
Nigeria
Pakistan
Papua New Guinea
Sierra Leone
South Africa
Sri Lanka
St Kitts and Nevis
Tanzania
Trinidad and Tobago
Uganda
Zambia
Zimbabwe

External sources

Election and voting-related organizations
Commonwealth of Nations